Białobrzegi Lock - the fourth lock on the Augustów Canal (from the Biebrza River). Located in the village of Białobrzegi in the administrative district of Gmina Augustów, within Augustów County, Podlaskie Voivodeship, in north-eastern Poland.
In the years 1959 - 1964 was demolished and built, using original art, a new 150 meters on the other side of the road Augustów – Białystok. The reason for this change were to be the cause of the military.

 Location: 26.9 km channel
 Level difference: 2.08 m
 Length: 42.8 m
 Width: 5.90 m
 Gates: Metal
 Year built: 1825 - 1826, rebuilt 1959 - 1964
 Construction Manager: Eng. Wojciech Korczakowski

References

 
 
 

19th-century establishments in Poland
Białobrzegi
Augustów County
Buildings and structures in Podlaskie Voivodeship